Dover Bay Secondary School is the largest public high school in Nanaimo, British Columbia. It was founded in 1992. In 2002, Dover Bay had 1860 students.

In 2011, it was the recipient of the Staples (Canada) Recycle for Education award for its excellence in being eco-responsible, and in turn constructed a computer lab valued at $50,000. In 2012, students at Dover Bay brought the school to media attention when it won the Einstruction Flip Your Classroom Makeover Contest for its Gangnam Style - inspired music video.

References

External links 
 

Educational institutions established in 1992
Buildings and structures in Nanaimo
Education in Nanaimo
High schools in British Columbia
1992 establishments in British Columbia